Edward Hain Hospital is a health facility in Albany Terrace, St Ives, Cornwall, England. It is managed by Cornwall Partnership NHS Foundation Trust.

History
The facility was commissioned as a memorial to Captain Edward Hain, who had died in the First World War. It was established by converting a large private property in Albany Terrace and it opened in 1920. It joined the National Health Service in 1948. It closed temporarily due to fire safety issues in 2016 but then re-opened as a facility for local people who have recently been discharged from hospital in 2019.

Notes

References

External links 

Hospital buildings completed in 1920
Hospitals established in 1920
Hospitals in Cornwall
NHS hospitals in England
1920 establishments in England
Buildings and structures in St Ives, Cornwall